Ocotea amplifolia  is a plant species in the family Lauraceae. It is a small tree endemic to Guatemala where it has only been found in the department Quiché.

References

amplifolia
Endemic flora of Guatemala
Quiché Department
Trees of Guatemala